DMAB can refer to:

 Designated Male At Birth, a sex assignment given at birth to identify a baby's sex
 para-Dimethylaminobenzaldehyde, an organic chemical compound 
 Denosumab, a drug for treating osteoporosis